Abyssochrysos is a genus of bathyal sea snails, marine gastropod mollusks in the family Abyssochrysidae.

Description
The characteristics (shell, radula and anatomy) of the species mark this genus as simple gastropods, unassigned in the clade Caenogastropoda. Their taenioglossate radula (formula: 2+1+1+1+2) is unique among the Prosobranchia because of the sickle-shaped rachidian tooth and the thick,
sinuous, sharply cusped lateral teeth. They have tentacles but lack eyes. The mantle cavity goes deep (about 2½ whorls). The long, wide ctenidium is monopectinate. The pallial gonoducts are closed. The large penis-like organ is a right-dorsal mantle process.

Species
Species within the genus Abyssochrysos include:
 Abyssochrysos bicinctus Bouchet, 1991
 Abyssochrysos brasilianus Bouchet, 1991
 Abyssochrysos eburneus Locard, 1897
 Abyssochrysos melanioides Tomlin, 1927
 Abyssochrysos melvilli Schepman, 1909
 Abyssochrysos xouthos Killeen & Oliver, 2000
Species brought into synonymy
 Abyssochrysos bicinctum Bouchet, 1991: synonym of Abyssochrysos bicinctus Bouchet, 1991
 Abyssochrysos brasilianum Bouchet, 1991: synonym of Abyssochrysos brasilianus Bouchet, 1991
 Abyssochrysos eburneum (Locard, 1897): synonym of Abyssochrysos eburneus (Locard, 1897)

References

 Bouchet P. (1991). New records and new species of Abyssochrysos (Mollusca, Caenogastropoda).' Journal of Natural History 25(2): 305–313

 
Abyssochrysidae